The following is a list of Nippon Professional Baseball players with the last name starting with W, retired or active.

W

References

External links
Japanese Baseball

 W